Leila Kayondo is a Ugandan musician.

Early life and education
Kayondo sang in school choirs and took part in school festivals when she was at Seeta Boarding Primary School and at Naalya Secondary School Namugongo for her O-Level. She continued the same road when she joined Greenville International School for A-Level. She graduated from Uganda Christian University in Mukono where she pursued a bachelor's degree in social works and social administration.

Music
Kayondo started her music career in Dream Gals, an all girl-music group, after taking part in a competition that led to the group. The group had hit songs "weekend" and "Wandekangawo".

In 2009, Kayondo left the group to embark on a solo career. She has had hit songs like "Awo", and "Relaxing". She signed to Striker Entertainment, a Nigeria-based record label, in Uganda in 2017, releasing two hit singles, "Respeck" and "Musaayi".

References 

1988 births
Uganda Christian University alumni
21st-century Ugandan women singers
Living people
Kumusha